The 1982 World Men's Handball Championship was the 10th team handball World Championship. It was held in West Germany between 23 February-7 March 1982. Soviet Union won the championship.

Teams

Preliminary round

Group A

Group B

Group C

Group D

Second round

Group 1

Group 2

13th to 16th place

11th / 12th place 

 (1) -  In Minden

9th / 10th place 

 (1) -  In Minden

7th / 8th place 

 (1) -  In Dortmund

5th / 6th place 

 (1) -  In Dortmund

3rd / 4th place

 (1) -  In Dortmund

Final

(1) - In Dortmund

Final standings

Source: International Handball Federation

World Handball Championship tournaments
World Mens Handball Championship, 1982
H
World Men's Handball Championship
World Men's Handball Championship
World Men's Handball Championship